Daejeon Hana Citizen Football Club (Korean 대전 하나 시티즌 축구단) is a South Korean professional football team based in Daejeon that competes in the K League 1, the top tier of South Korean football. At the time of its foundation in 1997, Daejeon Citizen was the first community club in South Korea, not belonging to any company. The club first entered the K League for the 1997 season, finishing in seventh place. In spite of a limited budget, Daejeon won the 2001 Korean FA Cup. It has not achieved sustained success in the K League, historically occupying the middle and lower reaches of the standings each season. At the end of the 2013 season, Daejeon was relegated to the K League Challenge, the second-tier league.

On 24 December 2019, Hana Financial Group Football Club Foundation bought operating rights of the club, renaming the club to its current name.

History

First steps into the K League
Following the foundation of the professional football league (the Korean Super League, reorganised as the K League in 1998) in Korea, there were few league matches held in Daejeon, and such matches that were held were played by visiting clubs. The absence of a local team in the league made it difficult for the citizens of Daejeon to identify with any particular team. However, in 1996 a plan to establish 'Daejeon Citizen' – their own local community club – was unveiled, which meant Daejeon citizens would have their own team to support in the league. Generally in Korea, 'community-club' means that the club issues shares. In the case of Daejeon, although shares weren't issued until 2005 (and the issuing of shares continued into 2006), they were already known as a "community club". Daejeon was the first club that did not belong to a specific company such as one of the 'chaebols' (Samsung, LG or the like) or another major company. This has a very symbolic meaning as essentially the club is founded upon the support of the local community rather than a specific company.

Kim Ki-bok was appointed the first manager of Daejeon Citizen. With high expectations, Daejeon took their first step to the K League in 1997 (at the time, the K League was known as the Rapido Super League), opening their season with a match against Ulsan Hyundai Horang-i. However, the results achieved in their first season did not live up to their high expectations for their first season. Although the club placed seventh in the league, ahead of Cheonan Ilhwa Chunma, Anyang LG Cheetahs and Bucheon SK, they won only three matches out of 18 games.

The IMF Crisis
In 1998, a major economic crisis necessitated IMF intervention in the South Korean economy – this period of time is commonly referred to as the "IMF crisis" in South Korea. As a consequence a number of companies, including some considered to be "Chaebol" went bankrupt, and there was widespread unemployment. Daejeon Citizen did not escape this crisis unscathed. The main board of Daejeon consisted of 4 groups – Kyeryong Construction Industrial, Dong-A Construction, DongYang Department Store and Chung-cheong Bank. But as a consequence of the IMF crisis, three of the four groups went bankrupt, leaving Kyeryong as the only survivor of the original board. There was a subsequent impact on the level of financial and management support provided to the club. This made for a particularly difficult season in the 1998 season of the K League. Again, only three games were won, but this time Daejeon finished ninth in the league, ahead of only Cheonan Ilhwa Chunma.

The following year, 1999, Daejeon improved their winning record to six victories. However, changes in the K League structure since the previous year meant that an extra 9 games were played, 27 in total, from the previous season. There were a total of 18 losses, the worst in the league. Despite this, Daejeon improved to eighth out of ten clubs. For the 2000 season, Daejeon maintained its eighth position in the league.

On the verge of disappearing
For the 2001 season, Lee Tae-ho was appointed manager, and promptly took Daejeon Citizen's first piece of silverware, leading Daejeon to victory in the FA Cup. The decisive goal of the FA Cup final came from Kim Eun-jung, which gave the team a one-nil victory over the Pohang Steelers. Due to this win, Daejeon also qualified to the 2002–03 AFC Champions League for the first time. This helped compensate for their poor performance in the K League, in which they finished 10th and last, even on points with Jeonbuk Hyundai Motors but with an inferior goal differential.

South Korea was a co-host of the 2002 FIFA Football World Cup, with Daejeon as one of the host cities.  The city constructed a brand new stadium for the World Cup, and following the conclusion of the tournament, Daejeon Citizen changed stadiums.  The shift from their former stadium, Daejeon Hanbat Stadium, to Daejeon World Cup Stadium meant the club not only benefited from the new facilities, but also the greater capacity of the stadium. Daejeon's poor league performance from the previous year was carried into the 2002 season, and the club finished last again, and by some margin, having won but a single game throughout the season. Lee Tae-ho eventually resigned taking responsibility for the poor results. However, more creditable results were achieved in the AFC Champions League.  Although they did not make proceed beyond the group phase, they did finish second in the group, beating both Shanghai Shenhua and Kashima Antlers. Their only loss was to the eventual group winner and overall runner-up, Thai club BEC Tero Sasana.

In other changes for 2002, the key financial supporter of the club – Kyeryong, which with their support ensured that Daejeon Citizen would survive the IMF crisis – declared that they would withdraw from the club's board. Daejeon City Hall decided to give financial support to the club. This ensured the club would survive to participate in the 2003 season.

Miracle 2003
The 2003 season proved to be memorable for Daejeon fans. Choi Yun-kyum, previously coach at Bucheon SK, was appointed manager to replace Lee Tae-ho who had resigned in the wake of the club's 2002 season. Choi promptly inspired the team and completely changed its dynamics by implementing the 4–3–3 formation. The outcome was a near miraculous recovery from 2002, and he, together with Daejeon Citizen, coined the catchphrase "Miracle 2003". Daejeon Citizen finished the 2003 season in sixth place, its best finish ever in the league, having won 18 out of 44 games. Its sixth place was even more meritorious as the K League had expanded to twelve teams, with Daegu FC and Gwangju Sangmu Phoenix entering the competition for the first time. Daejeon also improved its average home game attendance to about 19,000.

It proved difficult for the club to maintain its performance into 2004. A lack of strike power at the attacking end of the field left the club with the worst offensive record of all the clubs in the K League, scoring 18 goals in 24 games. Daejeon slipped to eleventh place out of thirteen teams. However, they did make it to the semi-finals of the FA Cup, going down to eventual runners-up, Bucheon SK. Daejeon also finished as runners-up in the Hauzen Cup, behind only Seongnam Ilhwa Chunma.

The lack of penetration continued to be problematic into the 2005 season, with the club maintaining its record as the worst offensive side in the league, with only 19 goals scored in 24 games. However, superb defence saw only 20 goals conceded (best defensive record in the league) ensuring that Daejeon finished seventh in the regular season, having lost only six games. In the 2005 cup competitions, the FA Cup and the League Cup, Daejeon failed to progress to the quarter-final stage.

2007 Play-off qualification
Daejeon achieved what originally appeared by midseason at least, to be a highly unlikely qualification for the playoff phase of the K League following a 1–0 win over Suwon Samsung Bluewings which ensured a superior goal difference to FC Seoul, with whom Daejeon finished equal on points. The win over Suwon was Daejeon's fifth consecutive victory and ultimately enabled them to qualify for the championship playoffs for the first time in their history. By midseason, it had seemed like another disappointing season was in store for Daejeon fans, with precious few wins recorded, and a number of losses. When Kim Ho took over from previous manager Choi Yun-kyum in the mid-season, Daejeon were sitting in eleventh place. However, under the guidance of their coach, and with good performances from Denilson, who scored 14 goals, and one of Korea's best technical players, Ko Jong-soo, they eventually qualified for the play-offs. They were ultimately beaten by Ulsan Hyundai in the first phase of the play-offs.

Stadium
Since the 2002 K League season, which kicked off within a few weeks of the conclusion of the 2002 FIFA Football World Cup, Daejeon Citizen FC have played their home games at Daejeon World Cup Stadium. The stadium was specifically constructed for the world cup, and was completed in September 2001. Daejeon World Cup Stadium hosted two group games of the world cup, as well as the South Korea/Italy quarter-final. The fans of Daejeon Citizen have nicknamed the stadium "Purple Arena". The stadium has a seating capacity of 40,535. The last four home games of the 2014 season were played at the Hanbat Stadium, Daejeon's old ground to allow time for maintenance work to be carried out at World Cup Stadium. Daejeon will return to the World Cup Stadium for the 2015 season.

Players

Current squad

Out on loan

Retired numbers(s)

18 – Kim Eun-jung
21 – Choi Eun-sung

Coaching staff

Managers

Honours

League 
 K League 2
Winners (1): 2014
Runners-up (2): 2021, 2022

Cups 
 Korean FA Cup
Winners (1): 2001

 Korean League Cup
Runners-up (1): 2004
 Korean Super Cup
Runners-up (1): 2002

Records

Key
Tms. = Number of teams
Pos. = Position in league (regular season)

AFC Champions League record
All results (home and away) list Daejeon's goal tally first.

References

External links

 Official website 

Association football clubs established in 1997
1997 establishments in South Korea
Sport in Daejeon
 
K League 1 clubs
K League 2 clubs